Diadié Diarra (born 23 January 1993) is a professional footballer who plays for Lyon La Duchère as a defender. Born in France, he represents Mauritania at international level.

Career
Born in Paris, France, Diarra has played for Mantes, Valenciennes B, Amiens, Épernay Champagne, Auxerre B, Gueugnon, Stade Bordelais, Sedan, Canet Roussillon and GOAL FC.

He made his international debut for Mauritania in 2017.

References

1993 births
Living people
Citizens of Mauritania through descent
Mauritanian footballers
Mauritania international footballers
French footballers
French sportspeople of Mauritanian descent
FC Mantois 78 players
Valenciennes FC players
AC Amiens players
RC Épernay Champagne players
AJ Auxerre players
FC Gueugnon players
Stade Bordelais (football) players
CS Sedan Ardennes players
Canet Roussillon FC players
GOAL FC players
Lyon La Duchère players
Championnat National 2 players
Championnat National 3 players
Association football defenders
2019 Africa Cup of Nations players
2021 Africa Cup of Nations players